Seelig Peak is an ice-free peak,  high, which marks the summit of the Campbell Hills on the southern side of Nimrod Glacier. In 2005, in association with Mount Christchurch, the New Zealand Geographic Board named this peak after Walter R. Seelig (1919-2005), the National Science Foundation representative in Christchurch during eleven U.S. Antarctic Research Program austral deployments between 1971 and 1986. Seelig was accompanied in the Christchurch sojourns by his wife, Josephine Seelig.

References

Mountains of the Ross Dependency
Shackleton Coast